Germantown is a neighborhood three miles southeast of downtown Louisville, Kentucky, USA. Germantown is also a general term for an area of Louisville from the Original Highlands to St Joseph and Bradley neighborhoods that were predominantly settled by Germans. The actual neighborhood is bounded by Barrett Ave, Eastern Parkway, and the South Fork of Beargrass Creek.

History 
The area was  settled as small farms and butcher shops by German immigrants in the 1870s. At this time the area was nicknamed 'Frogtown' because the adjacent Beargrass Creek frequently flooded the area, causing numerous epidemics of malaria. The flooding problem was solved when Beargrass Creek was routed into a much deeper concrete canal. The area was subdivided and developed heavily during the 1890s, when the largest collection of shotgun houses in the city of Louisville was built.

In 1907, a bridge was built across the South Fork of Beargrass Creek which allowed French settlers north of the creek, in an area called Paristown, to attend the one Catholic church in the area.

The German-Paristown Neighborhood Association was founded in 1973, making it one of Louisville's very first neighborhood associations.

Today the area is undergoing a transition to a younger, more educated demographic. Many homes in the neighborhood are being renovated and urban homesteading (complete with gardens, bee hives, and backyard chickens) is common.

Demographics
As of 2000, the population of Germantown was 3,867, of which 93.9% are white, 4.2% are black, 1.6% are listed as other, and 0.7% are Hispanic. College graduates are of the 17.9% population, people without a high school degree are 29.3%. Females outnumber males 52.9% to 47.1%.

See also
Butchertown, Louisville
History of the Germans in Louisville

References

External links
   Images of Germantown (Louisville, Ky.) in the University of Louisville Libraries Digital Collections 

German-American culture in Louisville, Kentucky
Neighborhoods in Louisville, Kentucky